The discography of the Japanese singer and actress Hikaru Nishida consists of twelve studio albums, four compilation albums, and twenty-five singles released since 1988.

Albums

Studio albums

Live albums

Compilations

Singles

Regular singles

Other singles

Videography

Music video albums

Live video albums

Footnotes

References 

Discographies of Japanese artists
Pop music discographies